Stock theater may refer to:

Repertory theatre, a Western theatre or opera production by a resident company
Summer stock theatre, an American theatre that presents stage productions only in the summer